The 2014 Craven District Council election took place on 22 May 2014 to elect members of Craven District Council in North Yorkshire, England. One third of the council was up for election and the Conservative party stayed in overall control of the council.

After the election, the composition of the council was as follows:
Conservative 18
Independent 9
Liberal Democrats 2
Vacant 1

Background
After the last election in 2012 the Conservatives had a 2-seat majority with 16 councillors, compared to 10 independents and 4 Liberal Democrats. The Conservative majority was increased in 2013 when the independent councillor for Hellifield and Long Preston Chris Moorby joined the Conservatives. By the time of the 2014 election a further seat was vacant after the death of Liberal Democrat councillor Polly English, meaning that before the election the council had 17 Conservative, 9 independent and 3 Liberal Democrat councillors.

9 seats were contested in 2014 with no candidates from the Liberal Democrats standing, even in Aire Valley with Lothersdale where the Liberal Democrat councillor for the previous 12 years, Mark Wheeler stood down at the election. However Labour for the first time in many years put up candidates for all 9 seats contested, despite not holding any seats on the council before the election. The Conservatives stood in 8 seats, just not standing in Sutton-in-Craven against independent councillor, Stephen Place, who was allied with the Conservatives. Other candidates included a further two independents, including sitting councillor Philip Barrett, and one candidate from the UK Independence Party.

Election result
Only one seat changed hands at the election with the Conservatives gaining a seat from the Liberal Democrats to have 18 councillors. The Conservative gain came in Aire Valley with Lothersdale where Patrick Mulligan picked up the seat vacated by Liberal Democrat Mark Wheeler to become the only new councillor after the election. This reduced the Liberal Democrats to 2 seats on the council, while there remained 9 independents and 1 seat was vacant in Skipton West.

Ward results

By-elections between 2014 and 2015
A by-election was held in Skipton West on 2 July 2014 after the death of Liberal Democrat councillor Polly English. The seat was gained for Labour by Peter Madeley with a majority of 42 votes over Liberal Democrat Edward Walker. The victory meant Peter Madeley became the first Labour councillor on Craven council since 1999.

References

Craven District Council elections
2014 English local elections
2010s in North Yorkshire